John Colthurst may refer to:

John Colthurst (1678–1756), MP for Tallow (Parliament of Ireland constituency) 1734–1756
Sir John Colthurst, 1st Baronet (died 1775), MP for Castlemartyr, Youghal and Doneraile
Sir John Conway Colthurst, 2nd Baronet (c. 1743–1787), of the Colthurst baronets

See also
Colthurst (disambiguation)